Edward Leach may refer to:

Edward Pemberton Leach (1847–1913), VC recipient
Edward Leach (bowls) (1880–1949), New Zealand lawn bowls player
Edward Leach (cricketer), formerly the presumed identity of Cecil Leach (1894–1973), English cricketer
Edward G. Leach, American politician

See also
Edward Leech (disambiguation)